Thru My Eyes is a studio album by Michel Camilo released in 1997 by Columbia Records.

Track listing 

"Poinciana" (Nat Simon; Buddy Bernier)
"Perdido" (H.J.Lengsfelder; Juan Tizol; Erwin Drake)
"Watermelon Man" (Herbie Hancock)
"A Night in Tunisia" (Dizzy Gillespie; Frank Paparelli)
"Song for My Father" (Horace Silver)
"Armando's Rhumba" (Chick Corea)
"St. Thomas" (Sonny Rollins)
"Oye Como Va" (Tito Puente)
"Afro-Blue" (Mongo Santamaria)
"Mambo Inn" (Mario Bauza)
"My Little Suede Shoes" (Charlie Parker)
"Manteca" (Dizzy Gillespie; Luciano "Chano" Pozo; W.Fuller)

Personnel 

Michel Camilo - Piano
Anthony Jackson - Bass
Lincoln Goines - Bass
John Patitucci - Bass
Cliff Almond - Drums
Horacio Hernández - Drums

References

See also 
Michel Camilo Discography

1997 albums
Michel Camilo albums
Columbia Records albums